The 1985 European Junior Badminton Championships was the ninth edition of the European Junior Badminton Championships. It was held in Pressbaum, Austria, in the month of March and April. Denmark won all the titles except Boys' singles which was won by England.

Medalists

Results

Semi-finals

Final

Medal table

References 

European Junior Badminton Championships
European Junior Badminton Championships
European Junior Badminton Championships
International sports competitions hosted by Austria